Stanislao Cannizzaro  (also  , ; 13 July 1826 – 10 May 1910) was an Italian chemist.  He is famous for the Cannizzaro reaction and for his influential role in the atomic-weight deliberations of the Karlsruhe Congress in 1860.

Biography 
Cannizzaro was born in Palermo in 1826. He entered the university there with the intention of making medicine his profession, but he soon turned to the study of chemistry.  In 1845 and 1846, he acted as assistant to Raffaele Piria (1815–1865), known for his work on salicin, and who was then professor of chemistry at Pisa and subsequently occupied the same position at Turin.

During the Sicilian revolution of independence of 1848, Cannizzaro served as an artillery officer at Messina and was also chosen deputy for Francavilla in the Sicilian parliament; and, after the fall of Messina in September 1848, he was stationed at Taormina. On the collapse of the insurgents, Cannizzaro escaped to Marseille in May 1849, and, after visiting various French towns, reached Paris in October. There he gained an introduction to Michel Eugène Chevreul's laboratory, and in conjunction with F.S. Cloez (1817–1883) made his first contribution to chemical research, in 1851, when they prepared cyanamide by the action of ammonia on cyanogen chloride in ethereal solution. In the same year, Cannizzaro accepted an appointment at the National College of Alessandria, Piedmont as professor of physical chemistry.  In Alessandria, he discovered that aromatic aldehydes are decomposed by an alcoholic solution of potassium hydroxide into a mixture of the corresponding acid and alcohol. For example, benzaldehyde decomposes into benzoic acid and benzyl alcohol, the Cannizzaro reaction.

In the autumn of 1855, Cannizzaro became professor of chemistry at the University of Genoa, and, after further professorships at Pisa and Naples, he accepted the chair of inorganic and organic chemistry at Palermo. There, he spent ten years studying aromatic compounds and continuing to work on amines, until in 1871 when he was appointed to the chair of chemistry at the University of Rome.

Apart from his work on organic chemistry, which includes also an investigation of santonin, Cannizzaro rendered great service to chemistry with his 1858 paper Sunto di un corso di Filosofia chimica, or Sketch of a course of chemical philosophy, in which he insisted on the distinction, previously hypothesized by Avogadro, between atomic and molecular weights.  Cannizzaro showed how the atomic weights of elements contained in volatile compounds can be deduced from the molecular weights of those compounds, and how the atomic weights of elements of whose compounds the vapour densities are unknown can be determined from a knowledge of their specific heats. For these achievements, of fundamental importance to atomic theory, he was awarded the Copley Medal by the Royal Society in 1891.

In 1871, Cannizzaro's scientific eminence secured him admission to the Italian senate, of which he was vice-president, and as a member of the Council of Public Instruction and in other ways he rendered important services to the cause of scientific education in Italy.

He is best known for his contribution to the then-existing debate over atoms, molecules, and atomic weights. He championed Amedeo Avogadro's notion that equal volumes of gas at the same pressure and temperature held equal numbers of molecules or atoms, and the notion that equal volumes of gas could be used to calculate atomic weights. In doing so, Cannizzaro provided a new understanding of chemistry.

Works 

Sunto di un corso di filosofia chimica, Genova, 1858
 
 Scritti intorno alla teoria molecolare ed atomica ed alla notazione chimica, "Lo Statuto" (Palermo), 1896, .
Scritti vari e lettere inedite nel centenario della nascita, Roma, 1926

See also 
 Cannizzaro reaction

References

External links 

 Sketch of a course of chemical philosophy by Cannizzaro (1858) – Edinburgh: Alembic Club Reprint No. 18 (1911).
  by Thomas Edward Thorpe in Essays in Historical Chemistry, London: Macmillan, pages 500 – 513 (also Nature, 6 May 1897).
 George B. Kauffman,  (1996). Review of Lettere a Stanislao Cannizzaro 1868–1872; Stanislao Cannizzaro: Scritti di Storia Politica e Chimica; Corrispondenza Varia, a set of Cannizzaro's papers

1826 births
1910 deaths
Scientists from Palermo
Italian chemists
Recipients of the Copley Medal
Members of the Senate of the Kingdom of Italy
Faraday Lecturers
Foreign Members of the Royal Society
Members of the Royal Academy of Belgium
Corresponding members of the Saint Petersburg Academy of Sciences
Burials at San Domenico, Palermo